The Gamma Phi Beta Sorority House, located in Eugene, Oregon, United States, is listed on the National Register of Historic Places.

See also
 National Register of Historic Places listings in Lane County, Oregon

References

1926 establishments in Oregon
Fraternity and sorority houses
Houses completed in 1926
Houses on the National Register of Historic Places in Eugene, Oregon
Tudor Revival architecture in Oregon
Sorority houses
History of women in Oregon